Asianet is a general entertainment private broadcast television network owned by The Walt Disney Company India. wholly owned by The Walt Disney Company. this is a list of programmes broadcast by the Malayalam general entertainment channel Asianet.

Current broadcasts

Drama series

Reality shows

Former broadcasts

Soap operas
123 Saat (2004–2005)
4 The People (2015–2016)
7 Rathrikal (2015)
Aardhram (2013)
Abhirami (2005)
Addeham Alla Iddeham (1995)
Agniputhri (2012)
Akkamma Stalinum Pathrose Gandhiyum (2015)
Akkarapacha (2002–2003)
Akkare Ikkare (2009)
Akshaya Pathram (2001–2002)
Alaavudheenum Albhudhavilakkum (2005)
Alaavudhinte Albhudhavilakku (2010–2011)
Alilathali (2008–2009)
Alimanthrikan
Alphonsamma (2008–2009)
American Dreams (2003)
Amma (2012–2015)
Amma Manassu (2006–2007)
Ammakkili (2011–2013)
Ammathamburatti (2006)
Ammathottil (2008–2009)
Angapurappaadu (1997)
Annu Peytha Mazhayil (2007–2008)
Autograph (2009–2012)
Avicharitham (2004)
Balaganapathy (2014–2015)
Bhamini Tholkkarilla (2009)
Bharya  (2016–2019)
Balahanuman (2021)
Black and White (2000–2001)
Black and White Season 2 (2004)
Butterflies (1999)
Chakrangal (1998)
Chandanamazha (2014–2017)
Chandralekha (2012)
Chechiyamma (2003–2004)
Chempattu (2017)
Chinthavishtayaya Seetha (2016–2017)
Crime and Punishment (2000–2001)
Dambathya Geethangal (2004–2005)
Daya: Chentheeyil Chalicha Kumkumapottu (2021–2022)
Devaragam (2010–2012)
Devatha (1999)
Devi Mahathmyam (2008–2012)
Dracula (2005)
Durga (2000–2001)
Ellam Mayajaalam (2005)
Enkilum Ente Gopalakrishna   (2008–2009)
Ente Manasaputhri (2007–2010) 
Ente MakkalEzham Kadalinakkare (2005)Gandharva Yaamam (2001)Gokulam (1998)Harichandanam (2010–2012)Hello Kuttichathan (2008–2009)Hridayanilavathu (2003)Hukka Hua Mikado (2000–2001)Idavazhiyile Poocha Mindapoocha (2002–2003)Innale (2002)Innocent Kadhakal (1994)Jalamohini (2002)Janakeeyam Janaki (2001–2002)January (2007)Kadalinakkare (2006)Kadamattath Kathanar (2004–2005)Kadhapathrangal: Muhoorthangal (1995)Kalyana Sougandhikam (2015–2016)Kana Kanmani (2016)Kanakuyil (2008)Kanalkireedam (2009)Kanmani (2002)Karuthamuthu (2014–2019)Kasthooriman (2017–2021)Kilikoodu (2001–2002)Koodum Thedi (2004–2005)Krishna Kripa SagaramKrishnathulasi (1999)KudipakaKudumbini (2005)Kudumbasthree (2005)Kudumbavilakku (2001–2002)Kumkumapoovu (2011–2014)Kunjali Marakkar (2010)Kunjikoonan (2011)Kunjunju Kathakal (2012)Ladies Hostel (2005)Lakshyam (2006)Life Is Beautiful (2004–2006)Lipstick (2010)Makal (2006)Mahathma Gandhi Colony (2000)Malayogam (2006–2007)Manal Nagaram (1999)Manasoruvaayanashaala (2000)Manassariyum Yanthram (1993)Mandrake (2006–2007)Mangalyam (2003–2004)Manthrakodi (2005–2006)Meera (2008)Megham (2004)Minnaram (2006)Muhoortham (2004)My Dear Kuttichathan Season 1 and 2 (2008–2009)Nakshathrangal (2001)Nandini Oppol (2001–2002)Neelakkuyil (2018–2020)Neermathalam (2017)NinakkayiNirakkootukal (1998–1999)Nirmalyam (2007–2008)Nizhalukal (2000–2002)NobleNokketha Doorathu (2005)Nombarapoovu (2007)Nonachiparu (2016)Olangal (2001)Omanathinkal Pakshi (2005–2006)Orma (2004–2005)Oru Mandarappoovu (2006)Oru Penninte Kadha (2004–2005)PatharamaatuPaying Guest (1997)Paadasaram (2013–2014)Paarijatham (2008–2011)Palunku (2021–2022)Parasparam (2013–2018)Paribhavam Parvathy (2004–2005)Pavithra Jayililanu (2007)Ponnoonjal (2006)Pournamithinkal (2019–2021)Pranayam (2015–2017)Rahasyam (2007–2008)Randaamathoral (2010–2011)Red Roses (2013–2014)Sabarimala Sreedharmasastha (2012–2013)Sabarimala Swamy Ayyappan (2019–2020)Sahadharmini (2005–2006)Samadooram (2006–2007)Samayam (1999–2000)Samayam Samagatham (2000–2001)Sankeerthanam (2000)Sanmansullavark Samadhanam (2006–2008)Santhanagopalam (2005)Sapathni (2001)Shanghupushpam (2002–2003)Shamanathalam (2001)Sharada (2002)Seetha Kalyanam (2018–2021)Shrikrishna Leela (2007–2008)Shri Mahabhagavatham (2008–2010)Silence (2000)Sindhooram (1999–2000)Sindoorarekha (2005)Sneha (2002)Snehanjali (2000)Snehadhooram (2002–2003)Snehathooval (2007–2010)Sparsham (2002)Sree Narayana GuruSreeraman Sreedevi (2000–2002)Sthree Part 1, 2, 3, 4 (1998–2003)Sthree (sequel to part 1) (2005–2007)Sthree Oru Santhwanam (2003–2004)Sthreedhanam (2012–2016)Sundari Sundari (2005)Suryaputhri (2004–2006)Swapnam (2003–2004)Swami Ayyappan (2006–2008)Swami Ayyappan Sharanam (2010–2011)Swantham (2003–2004)Swantham Suryaputhri (2006–2007)Swararaagam (2000–2002)Swarnamayooram (2006)Thalolam (2004–2005)Thadankal Palayam (2006)
  Thanichu [2005-2006]Thanichaay (2005)Thoovalsparsham (2021–2023)Unnimaya (2019)Unniyarcha (2007)Vajram (2000–2001)Vanambadi (2017–2020)Vasundhara Medicals (2001–2003)Veruthe Oru Bharthaavu (2010)Vellanakalude Naadu (2014–2016)Venalkalam (2001)Vigraham (2009–2010)Vikramadithyan (2005–2006)Vishudha Thomasleeha (2008)Vivahita (2002)Vrindavanam (2012–2013)

TelefilmsAntappante Surprise (2013)Ariyathe (1999)Avarodoppam Aliyum Achayanum (2020)Ithikkara Kochunni (2016)Mavelikkara Post Office (2014)Onam Bumper (2014)Paapi Chellunnnidam Pathaalam (2014)Pennu Pidicha Pulivaal (2014)Piyatha (1998)

Acquired series

Dubbed soap operas

 Ayushman Bhava (2018)
 Betaal Kadhakal (1997–1998)
 Hatim Veeragadha (2014)
 Kaanamarayathu (2020)
 Kailasanathan (2012–2015)
 Kannante Radha (2018–2021)
 Kavacham (2016)
 Mahabharatam (1997)
 Mahabharatham (2013–2014)
 Manga (1997–1998)
 Mahaganapathy (2004)
 Manthrikam (2021)
 Mohabath (2019–2020)
 Sanjivani (2020)
 Seethayanam (2016–2017)
 Shakthi (1997)
 Sreemurugan (2017–2018)
 Vezhambal (2017–2018)

AnimatedBobanum Mollyum (2003–2006)Kuttikkaattil.com (2006–2010)Thennali Raman (2003)

Reality and non-scripted shows

 5 Star Kitchen Season 1 & 2 (2020)
 5 Star Thattukada (2005–2008)
 Adukkala (2009–2011)
 Akathalam (1999–2002)
 Anantham Ajnatham (1996–2020)
 Anweshanam (1994–2001)
 Auto Show (1996)
 Badai Bungalow Season 1, 2
 Bharthakkanmarude Shradhakku (2013)
 Bigg Boss Malayalam Season 1, 2, 3 and 4 (2018–2022)
 Chill Bowl Cinema Diary (1998–2020)
 Cinemala (1993–2013)
 City Girls (2012)
 Comedy Nagar Second Street (2005)
 Comedy Show (2002–2004)
 Comedy Stars Season 1, 2 and 3 (2009–2022)
 Comic Cola (1993–2000)
 Dare the Fear: Aarkundu ee Chankootam? (2017–2018)
 Ente Keralam (1993–2001)
 Fastest Family First – Adi Mone Buzzer (2015–2016)
 Fastest Family First – Adi Mone Buzzer Season- 2 (2022)
 Filmy Thamasha (2003)
 Jagadish TV (2000–2001)
 Kannadi (1993–2016)
 Kerala Cafe Little Champion Little Stars (2013)
 Lunars Comedy Express (2012–2014)
 Mail Box (2003–2010)
 Mammootty – The Best Actor Award Season 1–3 (2009–2012)
 Manaporutham (2003–2005)
 Minnum Tharam (2006–2007)
 Minnum Tharam Season 2 (2021)
 Miss Kerala (2010–2011)
 Mukhyamanthriyodu Chodhikkaam (1996–2001)
 Munch Dance Dance (2011)
 Munch Stars (2013)
 Munch Star Singer Junior Season 1, 2 (2008–2011)
 Munshi (2000–2010)
 Music Beats (2008)
 Music India (2014)
 Mylanchy Season 1–5 (2011–2015)
 Naattarangu (1997–2002)
 Nadhamadhuri (1995–2003)
 Nammal Thammil (1994–2015) (2019, 2020)
 Ningalkkum Aakaam Kodeeshwaran Season 1–4 (2012–2017)
 Nithyaharitham (2006–2009)
 Paatupetty (1996–2012)
 Pathravishesham Pathrangaliloode (1997–2008)
 The People's Choice (2017)
 Playback (1995)
 Pulse (1999–2004)
 Raree Rareeram Raro Season 1
 Sakalakalavallabhan (2019)
 Salam Saleem Sancharam (2000–2013)
 Sangeetha Sagaram (2003)
 Sa.Ri.Ga.Ma, also known as Sa.Ri.Ga.Ma.Pa.Da.Ni.Sa from 2002–2008 (2001–2013)
 Sell Me the Answer Season 1–3 (2015–2019)
 Sona Khazana (2006)
 Sports Week (1998–2002)
 Start Music Aaradhyam Paadum Season 1, 2, 3, 4 (2019–2022)
 Star Singer Season 1–8 (2006–2022)
 Star Singer Junior Season 1, 2, 3 (2009–2023)
 Sundari Neeyum Sundaran Njanum (2012–2013)
 Suprabhatham (1996–2012)
 Thakadhimi (2007–2008)
 Top 10 (1998–2000) (2008–2011)
 Urvashi Theatres (2017–2018)
 Vaayanashaala (1998–2005)
 Valkannadi (2002–2014)
 Valkannadi: The matinee show (2021)
 Veendum Chila Veetuviseshangal (2020)
 Viswasichalum Illengilum (2005–2016)
 Voice of The Week (1997–1999)
 Your Choice'' (1997–2008)

References 

Asianet
Disney Star